Blarcamesine (development code ANAVEX2-73) is an experimental drug developed by Anavex Life Sciences.

It is in phase IIb/phase III trials for Alzheimer's disease and Rett syndrome, phase IIa trials for Parkinson's disease, phase I trials for epilepsy, and in preclinical trials for amyotrophic lateral sclerosis and stroke. Blarcamesine acts as a muscarinic receptor and a moderate sigma1 receptor agonist. 

In trials for Alzheimer's disease, Anavex Life Sciences reported that in patients with a fully functional SIGMAR1 gene, which encodes the sigma-1 receptor targeted by blarcamesine, the drug improved cognition as measured by the mini-mental state examination by 14% after 70 weeks of treatment. Competence in activities of daily living was improved by 8% in the same subgroup of patients. Additionally, in trials for Parkinson's disease, episodic memory was significantly improved after 14 weeks of treatment.

Pharmacokinetics
Blarcamesine may function as a pro-drug for ANAVEX19-144 as well as a drug itself. ANAVEX19-144 is a positional isomer of ANAVEX 1-41, which is similar to blarcamesine but it is not as selective for sigma receptor.

Properties and uses
Blarcamesine was originally tested in mice against the effect of the muscarinic receptor antagonist scopolamine, which induces learning impairment.  M1 receptor agonists are known to reverse the amnesia caused by scopolamine. Scopolamine is used in the treatment of Parkinson's disease and motion sickness by reducing the secretions of the stomach and intestines and can also decreases nerve signals to the stomach. This is via competitive inhibition of muscarinic receptors. Muscarinic receptors are involved in the formation of both short term and long term memories. Experiments in mice have found that M1 and M3 receptor agonists inhibit the formation of amyloid-beta and target GSK-3B. Furthermore, stimulation of the M1 receptor activates AF267B, which in turn blocks β-secretase, which cleaves the amyloid precursor protein to produce the amyloid-beta peptide. These amyloid-beta peptides aggregate together to form plaques. This enzyme is involved in the formation of Tau plaques, which are common in Alzheimer's disease. Therefore. M1 receptor activation appears to decreases tau hyperphosphorylation and amyloid-beta accumulation.
 
Sigma1 activation appears to be only involved in long-term memory processes. This partly explains why blarcamesine seems to be more effective in reversing scopolamine-induced long-term memory problems compared to short-term memory deficits. The sigma-1 receptor is located on mitochondria-associated endoplasmic reticulum membranes and modulates the ER stress response and local calcium exchanges with the mitochondria. Blarcamesine prevented Aβ25-35-induced increases in lipid peroxidation levels, Bax/Bcl-2 ratio and cytochrome c release into the cytosol, which are indicative of elevated toxicity. Blarcamesine inhibits mitochondrial respiratory dysfunction and therefore prevents against oxidative stress and apoptosis. This drug prevented the appearance of oxidative stress. Blarcamesine  also  exhibits anti-apoptotic and anti-oxidant activity. This is due in part because sigma-1 agonists stimulate the anti-apoptoic factor Bcl-2 due to reactive oxygen species dependent transcriptional activation of nuclear factor kB. Results from Maurice (2016) demonstrate that sigma1 compounds offer a protective potential, both alone and possibly with other agents like donepezil, an acetylcholinesterase inhibitor, or the memantine, a NMDA receptor antagonist.

References 

Muscarinic antagonists
Sigma agonists
Prodrugs
Dimethylamino compounds